Vivian Nutton FBA (born 21 December 1943) is a British historian of medicine who serves as Emeritus Professor at the UCL Centre for the History of Medicine, University College London, and current President of the Centre for the Study of Medicine and the Body in the Renaissance (CSMBR).

Nutton acquired his B.A. in Classics at the University of Cambridge in 1965 and subsequently taught there as a Fellow of Selwyn College (1967–77). He received his Ph.D. in 1970. Since 1977, he has worked at the Wellcome Trust Centre for the History of Medicine as a Lecturer, and since 1993 as Professor. He is a member of several international learned societies and a Fellow of the British Academy.

Since 2015, he has worked at I.M. Sechenov First Moscow State Medical University (1st MSMU).
Nutton's main field of research is the Ancient Greek physician Galen. Beyond that, his work comprises the whole of the ancient history of medicine and its reception history, in particular during the European Renaissance and in the medieval Islamic world.

Publications
 John Caius and the Manuscripts of Galen, Cambridge: Cambridge Philological Society, 1987
 From Democedes to Harvey: Studies in the History of Medicine, UK: Ashgate Publishing, 1988
 Medicine at The Courts of Europe 1500-1837, London: Routledge, 1990
 The Western Medical Tradition: 800 BC to Ad 1800, with Lawrence I. Conrad and Michael Neve, Cambridge: Cambridge University Press, 1995
 The History of Medical Education in Britain, Amsterdam: Rodopi, 1995
 Galen, On My Own Opinions, (trans.) Akademie Verlag, 1999
 Renaissance Studies: Medicine in the Renaissance City, (Ed.), Oxford: Oxford University Press, 2001 
 The Unknown Galen, London: Institute of Classical Studies, 2002
 Ancient Medicine, London: Routledge, 2005
 Pestilential Complexities: Understanding Medieval Plague, London: Wellcome Trust Centre for the History of Medicine at UCL, 2008
 Galen: On Problematical Movements, Cambridge: Cambridge University Press, 2011
 Method of Medicine, Volume I: Books 1-4 (Loeb Classical Library), Cambridge, Mass: Harvard Univ. Press, 2011

References

1943 births
Living people
British classical scholars
British medical historians
Fellows of Selwyn College, Cambridge
Academics of University College London
Alumni of Selwyn College, Cambridge
Fellows of the British Academy